Kastrup is a suburb of Copenhagen, Denmark, on the east coast of Amager in Tårnby Municipality. It is the site of Copenhagen Airport. In Danish, the airport is often called Kastrup Lufthavn (Kastrup Airport) or Københavns Lufthavn, Kastrup (Copenhagen Airport, Kastrup).

History

In 1749 Jacob Fortling obtained a royal license to establish a lime plant in Kastrup. It harbor in Kastrup for the landing of chalk from Saltholm. He soon diversified with a brickyard (1752) and a pottery specializing in faience (1755) at the same site. This marked the beginning of an industrial development that accelerated after the opening of Kastrup Glassworks in 1847. Copenhagen Airport opened in 1925.

Landmarks
Local landmarks include the National Aquarium Denmark, Kastrup Værk, Kastrupgaard  and Kastrup Church.

Notable people 

 Christiane Koren (1764–1815) a Danish-Norwegian writer, wrote poems, plays and diaries,

Sport 
 Malene Franzen (born 1970) a Danish rhythmic gymnast, competed at the 1988 Summer Olympics
 Dorthe Holm (born 1972) a Danish curler, skipped the Danish women's team at the 2006 Winter Olympics
 Jacob Carstensen (born 1978) a former freestyle swimmer, competed in three consequentive Summer Olympics
 Michael Falkesgaard (born 1991) a Danish-Filipino football goalkeeper
 Amalie Dideriksen (born 1996) a Danish road and track cyclist
 Karolina Jensen (born 2003) a Danish female curler

Companies
Scandinavian Airlines has its Denmark offices and the SAS Cargo head office in Kastrup. Transavia Denmark has its head office in Kastrup.

When SAS Commuter operated, its head office was in Kastrup. When Danair existed, its head office was in Kastrup.

Transport

Kastrup Station serves the M2 line of the Copenhagen Metro. Lufthavnen Station is the terminus of the line. 
Trains approach the station by a bridge over the Øresund Motorway (E20). The platform area is constructed above the Øresund Railway adjoining a multi-storey car park. The station connects to the airport at the north end of Terminal 3 on level 2. Intercity trains operate out of the Copenhagen Airport, Kastrup Station which is located beneath the airport terminal building. There are several buses that roam through the city of Kastrup, following bus-lines: 2A, 5A and 36.

Cultural references
The former Superfos A/S-Glasuldsfabrik mineral wool factory (now Vægterparken) between Nordmarksvej and Bøllevej, which closed in 1982, is used as a location at 1:26:08 in the 1977 Olsen-banden film The Olsen Gang Outta Sight.

References

Cities and towns in the Capital Region of Denmark
Copenhagen metropolitan area
Tårnby Municipality